Antti Luusuaniemi (born 7 September 1979) is a Finnish actor. He appeared in more than thirty films since 2003.

Selected filmography

References

External links 

1979 births
Living people
Finnish male film actors